Armavir City Stadium, known as Jubilee Stadium or Yubileynyi Stadion until 2017, is a football stadium in Armavir, Armenia, currently under redevelopment. The all-seater stadium has a capacity of 3,300 seats. 

The stadium will become part of the Armavir Football Academy currently being constructed by the Football Federation of Armenia. However, the infrastructure of the stadium is outdated, as it had never been renovated since its inauguration.

History
The stadium was originally opened in 1980 as the Jubilee Stadium (Yubileynyi Stadion in Russian), at the occasion of the 60th anniversary of the establishment of the Soviet rule in Armenia. At its inauguration, the stadium had 2 separate; eastern and western stands, with a capacity of around 10,000 spectators. It was home to FC Armavir until 2003 when the club was dissolved and retired from professional football.

In 1985, the stadium hosted a single match in the group stage of the FIFA World Youth Championship hosted by the Soviet Union.

Redevelopment
On 4 February 2016, the ownership of the stadium was transferred to the Football Federation of Armenia by the decision of the government. It is envisaged to upgrade the stadium with an investment of around US$ 1.65 million.

In mid-2017, the stadium was closed in order to undergo a large-scale reconstruction process. However, after several delays, the process was finally launched by the Football Federation of Armenia and completed by November 2021. The eastern stand of the stadium was entirely removed and replaced with an artificial-turf training pitch. The main stand was fully reconstructed and turned into an all-seater tribune with a capacity of 3,100 seats. The stadium which is surrounded by 3 regular-sized training fields was officially reopened on November 30, 2021.

References

Football venues in Armenia
Buildings and structures in Armavir Province